is a former Japanese football player. She played for Japan national team.

Club career
Ideue was born in Kagoshima Prefecture on May 5, 1987. After graduating from Nippon Sport Science University, she joined TEPCO Mareeze. However, the club was disbanded following the Fukushima Daiichi nuclear disaster in 2011. In June, she joined Nippon TV Beleza. In 2012, she moved to Vegalta Sendai. She retired at the end of the 2015 season.

National team career
On May 11, 2010, Ideue debuted for Japan national team against Mexico.

National team statistics

References

External links
Vegalta Sendai

1987 births
Living people
Nippon Sport Science University alumni
Association football people from Kagoshima Prefecture
Japanese women's footballers
Japan women's international footballers
Nadeshiko League players
TEPCO Mareeze players
Nippon TV Tokyo Verdy Beleza players
Mynavi Vegalta Sendai Ladies players
Women's association football defenders
Universiade silver medalists for Japan
Universiade medalists in football
Medalists at the 2009 Summer Universiade